Tommy Brasher is an American football coach for the Kansas City Chiefs. He currently works on special projects for the Chiefs. He coached the Philadelphia Eagles line in 1985, then moved on to the Atlanta Falcons until 1989. After this he went to the Tampa Bay Buccaneers to coach for one year in 1990. He coached the Seattle Seahawks Defensive line from 1992-1998. Then he went back to the Philadelphia Eagles from 1999, until 2005, when he retired. In 2001, he was awarded the Eagles Ed Block Courage Award. He came out of retirement in 2012 to rejoin the Eagles after the firing of Jim Washburn to finish the season. After head coach Andy Reid was fired by the Eagles and hired by the Chiefs, Brasher was among the assistant coaches who followed Reid to Kansas City.

References

Year of birth missing (living people)
Living people
Arkansas Razorbacks football coaches
Atlanta Falcons coaches
Louisiana–Monroe Warhawks football coaches
Kansas City Chiefs coaches
New England Patriots coaches
Philadelphia Eagles coaches
Seattle Seahawks coaches
Shreveport Steamer coaches
SMU Mustangs football coaches
Tampa Bay Buccaneers coaches
Virginia Tech Hokies football coaches
High school football coaches in Arkansas
High school football coaches in Texas
People from El Dorado, Arkansas
Players of American football from Arkansas